Amelia Dimoldenberg (born 30 January 1994) is an English journalist, comedian, YouTuber, and television presenter. She created the web series Chicken Shop Date, in which she interviews rappers, grime artists as well as other YouTubers and Premier League footballers in fried chicken restaurants. She is known for her use of sarcasm, deadpan humour and awkward silences in her interviews.

Early life and education
Dimoldenberg grew up in Marylebone in the City of Westminster and attended St Marylebone School. Her father is Paul Dimoldenberg, a Labour Party member of Westminster City Council. She studied A-levels in English, art, politics and IT, and went on to obtain a Foundation Diploma in Art and Design and a BA in Fashion Communication from Central Saint Martins, London. Of her time at university, she has written, "I was always on the outskirts of the ultra-fashionable scene and left the party-going to those who had the stamina, and the invite".

Career

Chicken Shop Date
Chicken Shop Date began as a humorous column written by Dimoldenberg for the youth magazine The Cut, which was based at the Stowe Centre, a youth club on Harrow Road, London. It was other members' interest in grime that led her to interview grime artists, as she "wanted to know more about the music"; she began by interviewing "friends of friends". Dimoldenberg had the idea to frame the interviews as dates, and the location of a chicken shop was chosen as it was "somewhere you wouldn't usually go on a date". The first filmed episode was released in 2014 – it featured a "date" with the grime MC Ghetts.

The filming of each episode takes around 40 minutes; finished episodes last at most seven. Dimoldenberg has described her persona in the show as "an exaggerated version of myself" adding that "in the edit is where the character comes through, we chop and cut things, we make it more awkward". While noting that Chicken Shop Date is "not as popular" as American interview formats like Hot Ones, Between Two Ferns with Zach Galifianakis and Carpool Karaoke, Jonah Engel Bromwich of The New York Times has described it as "notable for the way in which it has grown through tapping into a specific subculture", writing that "[c]apturing an audience of music enthusiasts has given the show credibility".

Television
In 2018, Dimoldenberg presented the Channel 4 documentary Meet the Markles, in which she travelled to the United States to meet members of Meghan Markle's family; The Telegraph called it "an entertaining ride [...] slicked by moments of real hilarity" and the Evening Standard described it as an "instant hit". However, the Metro JJ Nattrass wrote that "many viewers at home didn't quite get what the show or its host were aiming for, and were left feeling confused", but conceded that "there were also plenty of viewers who genuinely enjoyed the satirical skew of the programme".

The same year, she appeared in an episode of The Big Narstie Show alongside David Haye, Rachel Parris and Krept and Konan. In October 2018, she appeared in the first series of the ITV2 hip hop-themed comedy show Don't Hate the Playaz as a "roving reporter". The programme was nominated for a Royal Television Society Award in the Entertainment category. Dimoldenberg did not appear in the second series, which aired in autumn 2019. In 2020 she appeared on Channel 4's Celebrity Come Dine with Me with Marcel Somerville, Dave Benson Phillips, Anthea Turner and AJ Odudu.

In March 2021, Dimoldenberg appeared as a guest on Soccer AM.

In December 2021, it was announced that Dimoldenberg would host a web shorts series titled Celebrity Rebrand for Channel 4. The first season, consisting of six episodes, was released via the network's social media channels. The comedy programme features Dimoldenberg as a "celebrity brand visionary" attempting to assist various Channel 4 stars in rebranding their image.

Beginning in 2022 Dimoldenberg became a brand ambassador for Olay. In January 2023, Dimoldenberg appeared on Taskmaster New Year's Treat, alongside Rebecca Lucy Taylor, Sir Mo Farah, Greg James and Carol Vorderman.

References

External links

Amelia Dimoldenberg at The Guardian
Amelia Dimoldenberg at Vice

1994 births
Living people
21st-century English comedians
Alumni of Central Saint Martins
Comedians from London
Comedy YouTubers
English documentary filmmakers
English women comedians
English television presenters
English women journalists
English YouTubers
The Guardian journalists
Vice Media
21st-century English women
20th-century English women
20th-century English people